The first season of Mask Singer: Adivina quién canta premiered on 4 November 2020, and lasted for 8 episodes. On 23 December 2020, Catrina (actress Paz Vega) was declared the winner.

Panelists and host
Arturo Valls served as the show's host, and was joined by a permanent panel of 'investigators' composed of actors Javier Calvo and Javier Ambrossi, singer Malú and comedian José Mota. Some episodes also featured guest panelists. Classical singer Ainhoa Arteta (who would later make a guest appearance in season 2 as "Paella") was initially slated to be in the panel, but pulled out due to delays in production caused by the coronavirus pandemic and was replaced by Malú. Also, Vanesa Martín stood in for Malú when she missed a taping due to injury and Eva González appeared as a guest investigator.

Contestants

Guest masks
The following two celebrities also appeared under a mask for one-off performances.

Episodes

Week 1 (4 November)

Week 2 (11 November)

Week 3 (18 November)

Week 4 (25 November)

Week 5 (2 December)
 Vanesa Martín stood in for an absent Malú in the investigators' panel.

Week 6 (9 December)
 Eva González appeared as a guest investigator.

Week 7 (16 December)

Week 8 (23 December)

Ratings

References

2020 Spanish television seasons
Masked Singer